Loberus ornatus is a species of pleasing fungus beetle in the family Erotylidae. It is found in North America.

References

Further reading

 

Erotylidae
Articles created by Qbugbot
Beetles described in 1904